Live Classics is a live album by Australian band, Little River Band. It was recorded during their 1992 world tour. The album also included two new studio songs, "Walk Together" and "My Own Way Home". It was the last Little River Band album (other than subsequent compilations) with founder, Glenn Shorrock as lead vocalist.

Background and release

During 1992 Little River Band went on an extensive worldwide tour throughout Europe and United States. A live album of the tour was released, Live Classics. It was dedicated to Wayne Nelson's daughter Aubree, who at the age of 13 died in a car crash that year.

Track listing

"Happy Anniversary" – Birtles, Briggs (4:50)
"It's a Long Way There" – Goble (4:19)
"I Dream Alone" – Pellicci, Shorrock (5:56)
"Skyboat" – Trad. (1:30)
"Man on Your Mind" – Shorrock, Tolhurst (3:54)
"Lonesome Loser" – Briggs (4:00)
"Take It Easy on Me" – Goble (4:03)
"Reminiscing" – Goble (6:48)
"Baby Come Back" – Beckett, Crowley (5:08)
"Walk Together" – Froggatt, Thomas (3:42)
"The Night Owls" – Goble (5:31)
"Help Is on Its Way" – Shorrock (4:24)
"Cool Change" – Shorrock (5:43)
"Lady" – Goble (4:11)
"Summertime Blues" – Capehart, Cochran (4:16)
"Walk Together" [Studio] – Froggatt, Thomas (3:30)
"My Own Way Home" [Studio] – Cadd, Shorrock (4:16)

Personnel

Little River Band
Glenn Shorrock - lead vocals
Wayne Nelson - bass guitar, vocals 
Derek Pellicci  - drums
Stephen Housden  - lead guitar
Peter Beckett - guitar, vocals
Richard Bryant  - keyboards, vocals

References

Little River Band albums
1992 live albums
Live albums by Australian artists
EMI Records live albums